Belfort Instrument Company is a company that makes various meteorological products, including the DigiWx Automated Weather System, which has been installed in various airports. They are also known for their Fisher & Porter rain gauge.

They currently have a contract with the NOAA's Air Resources Laboratory to evaluate climate observing systems.

References

External links 

Manufacturing companies based in Baltimore
Meteorological companies
Research and development in the United States
1876 establishments in Maryland
Aviation meteorology